The Santa Barbara Museum of Natural History is a natural history museum in Santa Barbara, California.

It reconnects more than 150,000 people each year (including their 5,700 members) to nature indoors and outdoors. Nestled in nature, the museum is located along Mission Creek in the Mission Canyon area. The museum has ten indoor exhibit halls focusing on regional natural history including astronomy, birds, insects, geology, mammals, marine life, paleontology, plant life, and the Chumash Indians. It holds a research library, the John & Peggy Maximus Art Gallery   and is the only museum to house a full-dome planetarium on the Central Coast.

History
The early roots of the museum date back to the 1880s, when a group of professional and amateur scientists, including botanist Caroline Bingham, started the Santa Barbara Natural History Society and an accompanying museum at 1226 State Street. Though the effort waned at the end of the century, the arrival of ornithologist William Leon Dawson from Ohio re-ignited the effort. Dawson and a group of prominent Santa Barbarans founded the Museum of Comparative Oology, which was first located in two outbuildings on his property on Puesta del Sol Road in Mission Canyon. The initial holdings were assembled from his own extensive collection of bird eggs as well as collections of other community members. According to the museum's website, Dawson believed oology—the study of bird eggs—“would throw a flood of light upon the trend of life itself,” yielding “the secrets of life’s origins and its destiny.”

Though it began from a collection of bird eggs, the holdings of the museum were soon expanded into other realms by its board of directors. The successor to William Dawson as director was Ralph Hoffmann, a Harvard-trained educator, botanist, and ornithologist. The next director was Paul Marshall Rea, who had been president of the American Association of Museums, director of the Cleveland Museum of Natural History, and director of the Carnegie Foundation in Washington, D.C. Some notable benefactors of the museum included Dr. Caroline Hazard, who was president of Wellesley College at the time: she donated part of her estate in Mission Canyon for a new museum building. This building was built with funds donated by Mrs. Rowland G. Hazard in memory of her late husband and opened in 1923.  The architect was Carleton Winslow.

In 1937, Arthur Sterry Coggeshall came to Santa Barbara, and took the position of director of the museum, a title he held for 21 years. He had also worked at various prestigious museums, such as the American Museum of Natural History in New York City and the Carnegie Museum of Natural History in Pittsburgh. Upon coming, he convinced Max Fleischmann, heir to the Fleischmann Yeast fortune, to build Fleischmann Auditorium as a condition of his employment. Coggeshall was later a key player in the foundation of the California Association of Museums and the Western Museum Association.

Following Coggeshall, Dr. Vertress L. VanderHoof, a research geologist from the University of California, Berkeley, was hired as director. In 1965, Dr. Frederick H. Pough became director; he was a vulcanologist and mineralogist from the American Museum of Natural History.  In between the tenure of these last two directors, interim directors were recruited from staff and an outsider who lasted only a short time.  In 1972, the museum hired Dr. Dennis Power, an evolutionary biologist specializing in birds on islands.  Power was a native Californian who at the time was an Associate Curator at the Royal Ontario Museum in Toronto.  He stayed until 1994 when he was recruited to be the executive director of the Oakland Museum of California, 22 years being the longest tenure of any of the museum's leaders.  From the 1960s through the 1990s, the museum had a large role in the field of environmental action. Museum scientists helped establish the whale stranding network and participated in the California Condor Project.  Museum staff also undertook contracted biological and anthropological surveys, among the most significant being the initial studies for the National Park Service that eventually led to the creation of Channel Islands National Park.

Albert Einstein, who was visiting the museum with his wife in 1931, remarked, "I can see that this museum has been built by the work of love."

Exhibits

The museum is renowned for fine dioramas of birds, mammals, and southern California habitats. These were illustrated in the 1930s and 1960s by famous artists of the California school of plein-aire painters. Among the most notable of these is the Bird Habitat Hall featuring mounted specimens by staff members Egmont Rett and Waldo Abbott and background paintings by Ray Strong. The museum is also known for its halls of marine life, geology, and Chumash Indian life, as well as an art gallery dedicated to antique natural history prints. It has collections of over 3 million specimens and an active research program with a focus on marine biology, terrestrial vertebrates, insects, anthropology, geological mapping, and natural history art. Greeting visitors near the front entrance is what has become an iconic display for the museum and Santa Barbara: a rearticulated skeleton of a  blue whale.

Temporary exhibits cover the whole range of natural history topics such as dinosaurs, sharks, antique natural history art, "Butterflies Alive" and “Bringing the Condors Home” telling the story of the decline and beginning of recovery of the California condor. 

The museum’s Gladwin Planetarium was renovated in early 2005 and equipped with technology to display distant planets, stars, and galaxies. The museum will launch a $30 million remodel in fall 2016, starting with the butterfly pavilion. During the renovation, the museum will stay open, and the square footage will remain unchanged.

The Santa Barbara Museum of Natural History Sea Center, formerly known as the "Ty Warner Sea Center", is an off-site facility owned and operated by the Museum of Natural History and is located on Santa Barbara’s historic Stearns Wharf. It originally opened in 1986 and was expanded and renovated in 2005. Among the exhibits of the Sea Center are a life-size model of a gray whale and calf, tide pool with waves rushing into it every 60 seconds, the Wet Deck featuring direct access to the water below, the Channel Theater, the Workshop, the Whale Karaoke station, and the plastinated dolphin.

The museum has one of the largest extant collections of historical Native American basketry by Chumash basket weaver artists.

See also
List of museums in California
Visual arts by indigenous Californians
Native American basket weavers
Basket weaving

References

External links

 Official Santa Barbara Museum of Natural History website
 Chumash Basket photos

Museums in Santa Barbara, California
Natural history museums in California
Native American museums in California
Institutions accredited by the American Alliance of Museums
Museums established in 1916
1916 establishments in California
Mission Revival architecture in California
Spanish Colonial Revival architecture in California